Robert "Rob" Collins (born March 15, 1978) is a Canadian professional ice hockey player, currently an unrestricted free agent who most recently played for the Düsseldorfer EG of the Deutsche Eishockey Liga (DEL). Collins played eight games for the New York Islanders of the National Hockey League (NHL). Collins was born in Peterborough, Ontario.

Playing career
After four seasons with Ferris State University, Collins signed with the New York Islanders as an undrafted free-agent in 2003. Collins spent four seasons in the American Hockey League, one for the Grand Rapids Griffins and three for the Bridgeport Sound Tigers.

He played eight regular season games for the Islanders during the 2005–06 NHL season. On December 19, 2005, he scored his first NHL goal and added an assist against the Toronto Maple Leafs in a high scoring 9-6 defeat.

Despite his lack of NHL experience, his scoring record with the Sound Tigers was impressive, scoring a total of 53 goals and 163 points in 220 games over three seasons.

In the 2006–07 season, Collins signed with German team, the DEG Metro Stars of the DEL. After five seasons with the Stars it was confirmed on March 18, 2011, that Collins would join fellow DEL club, the Hamburg Freezers, for the 2011–12 season.

Collins returned to play in North America after 7 seasons in Germany, in signing with the Brampton Beast of the Central Hockey League for their inaugural 2013–14 season. Collins established himself as a top line player with 46 points in 39 games before leaving at the back end of the season to finish the year in the German DEL with Kölner Haie.

On May 5, 2014, Collins signed a one-year contract to return to Düsseldorfer EG, continuing on from his 5 previous seasons with the club.

Career statistics

Awards and achievements

References

External links
 

1978 births
Living people
Brampton Beast players
Bridgeport Sound Tigers players
Canadian ice hockey centres
DEG Metro Stars players
Düsseldorfer EG players
Ferris State Bulldogs men's ice hockey players
Grand Rapids Griffins players
Hamburg Freezers players
Ice hockey people from Ontario
Kölner Haie players
New York Islanders players
Sportspeople from Peterborough, Ontario
Undrafted National Hockey League players
Canadian expatriate ice hockey players in Germany
AHCA Division I men's ice hockey All-Americans